The Stash Spot is a digital album by rapper EDIDON of Outlawz, It was released on March 23, 2010.

Track listing

References

External links 
 O-4-L.com Official EDIDON's Website
 

2010 albums
E.D.I. albums
Outlawz albums
Albums produced by E.D.I.
Albums produced by Jazze Pha
Gangsta rap albums by American artists